Cherokee Trail may refer to:

 Cherokee Trail, a historic trail from Oklahoma to Wyoming
 Cherokee Trail at Stone Mountain, Georgia
 Trail of Tears, the forced relocation of Cherokee and others to Indian Territory
 Cherokee Trail Arboretum on the Tennessee Valley Authority's Chickamauga Reservation in Chattanooga
 Cherokee Trail High School in Aurora, Colorado
 Cherokee Path, colonial trade route in modern South Carolina